Electoral district of Reservoir was an electoral district of the Legislative Assembly in the Australian state of Victoria.

Members

Election results

See also
 Parliaments of the Australian states and territories
 List of members of the Victorian Legislative Assembly

References

Former electoral districts of Victoria (Australia)
1955 establishments in Australia
1992 disestablishments in Australia
Constituencies established in 1955
Constituencies disestablished in 1992